For the Order of the Polar Star in Sweden, see Order of the Polar Star.
The Order of the Polar Star (abbreviated PSO), established in 1894, is a private order in Norway. It is granted to persons who with significance have contributed to the development or the protection of Norwegian art and cultural heritage.

The Order of the Polar Star was established by Mikkel Dobloug on 18 October 1894, his 50th birthday. In 1997 the Order was revitalised by Dobloug's great-great-grandson Christian Mikkel Dobloug.

Bjørnstjerne Bjørnson was among the first receivers of the Order. Among recent years' receivers are prominent persons in Norway, among others Carl Nicolaus of Wedel Jarlsberg and Stein Erik Hagen.

List of receivers

References

External links 
 

Orders, decorations, and medals of Norway
1894 establishments in Norway